To Catch a King is a 1984 American thriller film directed by Clive Donner and written by Roger O. Hirson. Based on the 1979 novel by Jack Higgins (writing as Harry Patterson), the film stars Robert Wagner, Teri Garr, Horst Janson, John Standing, Barbara Parkins and Marcel Bozzuffi. It premiered on HBO on February 12, 1984.

Plot
The story is a fictionalized account of Operation Willi.

Cast 
Robert Wagner as Joe Jackson
Teri Garr as Hannah Winter
Horst Janson as Gen. Walter Schellenberg
John Standing as Duke of Windsor
Barbara Parkins as Duchess of Windsor
Marcel Bozzuffi as Col. da Cunha
Jane Lapotaire as Irene Neumann
Barry Foster as Max Winter
Peter Egan as Reinhard Heydrich
John Patrick as Maj. Kleiber
Constantine Gregory as Capt. Mohta
John Barron as Sir Walbert Selby
Edmund Kente as Lord Walter Monckton
Peter Woodthorpe as Elric Becker
Lex van Delden as Egger
Nicholas Courtney as de Oliveira

References

External links
 

1984 television films
1984 films
1984 thriller films
1980s English-language films
Films directed by Clive Donner
HBO Films films
Films based on British novels
World War II spy films
Cultural depictions of the Edward VIII abdication crisis
American thriller television films
1980s American films